Drillia erepta is a species of sea snail, a marine gastropod mollusc in the family Drilliidae.

Description

Distribution
This marine species has been found off Algoa Bay, South Africa

References

  Tucker, J.K. 2004 Catalog of recent and fossil turrids (Mollusca: Gastropoda). Zootaxa 682:1–1295

External links
 

Endemic fauna of South Africa
erepta
Gastropods described in 1969